Swedish women's football champions is a title held by the winners of the highest Swedish football league played each year, Damallsvenskan. FC Rosengård are the holders of the record of most titles with 12 Swedish championships. and are also the reigning champions after winning the 2021 Damallsvenskan.

Champions

Svenska riksmästerskapet (1972)

Svenska mästerskapet (1973–1977)

Division 1 (1978–1987)

Damallsvenskan Play-offs (1988–1992)

Damallsvenskan (1993–1997)

Damallsvenskan Play-offs (1998–1999)

Damallsvenskan (2000–)

Performances

Total titles won by club
A total of 14 clubs have been crowned Swedish champions from Öxabäck IF in 1973 till Kopparbergs/Göteborg FC in 2020.  A total of 48 Swedish championships have been awarded. FC Rosengård is the most successful club with 11 Swedish championships.

See also
 Damallsvenskan
 Football in Sweden
 Swedish football league system
 List of Damallsvenskan top scorers
 List of Swedish youth football champions

References

Champions
Sweden
champions
sv:Svenska mästare i fotboll (damer)